The 1924 Lombard Olive football team represented Lombard College in the 1924 college football season.

Schedule

References

Lombard
Lombard Olive football seasons
Interstate Intercollegiate Athletic Conference football champion seasons
Lombard Olive football